Zard-e Sheykh Hasan (also known as Zard) is a village in Osmanvand Rural District, Firuzabad District, Kermanshah County, Kermanshah Province, Iran. At the 2006 census, its population was 24, in 4 families.

References 

Populated places in Kermanshah County